A .ZAP File (Zero Administration Package) is a text file, which allows the publishing of an application to a user on a Microsoft Windows system (Windows 2000, XP Professional, Windows Vista, or Windows 7 Professional), for applications for which a .MSI file does not exist. It is used in Active Directory Domains and is installed using a Group Policy.

A basic .ZAP file
A .ZAP file can be as simple or as complicated as the System Administrator wishes to make it. There are only two required fields in a .ZAP file, an Application Name (called a Friendly Name) and a Setup Command line. Other information is optional.

The .ZAP File begins with a title line consisting of the word Application inside single Square Brackets ([ ]). Underneath this come the entry fields, the two Required fields being FriendlyName = "Name" and SetupCommand = "\\Server\share\setupfile". You can also add Optional entries, such as DisplayVersion = and Publisher =. Note that DisplayVersion and Publisher do not require Quotation Marks around the variables.

Below is a very simple example of a .ZAP file.
[Application]
FriendlyName = "Program"
SetupCommand = "\\FileServer\Share\setup.exe" /q

Restrictions to a .ZAP file
The .ZAP file is more restricted than a .MSI file in that it cannot be rolled back if the application fails to install correctly, cannot use elevated privileges to install itself (i.e. the User needs to have the rights to install the software - usually given by Group Policy) and cannot install on first use, or install a separate feature on first use.

Many .ZAP Files require user intervention. This can be overcome if the Systems Administrator creates a Batch file and runs a quiet or silent install from a Batch File command. However, running an Executable file (such as setup.exe) often bypasses quiet, passive or silent installation switches, even if specified in the SetupCommand.

In addition, .ZAP files are not run automatically prior to, or during a User Logon. Instead, the User must access Add/Remove Programs from within the Windows Control Panel, Select Add New Programs and select the Installation from here. The User must have access to the location where the .ZAP file is located and have access to the location of the Setup files (if these locations are different), otherwise they will not be able to install the Application.

.ZAP Files cannot be Assigned to Computers and must be published to Users. Therefore when a User moves to another computer (even only temporarily) they can install this application on that machine whether the program should be there or not.

Finally, .ZAP Files do not automatically uninstall when a User no longer requires the software. Instead, the software remains installed on the machine permanently, unlike a .MSI installation which can be set to uninstall when the Computer is removed from the relevant OU.

Publishing a .ZAP file
After creating a .ZAP file and placing it in an accessible share - usually creating an Active Directory Group with access to this location - the Systems Administrator needs to create a Group Policy Object, open the editing screen, select User Configuration, Software Settings and Software Installation and create a New Package to the location of the .ZAP file. Since GPOs default to .MSI, the System Admin needs to ensure that they search for .ZAP files, instead of .MSI files.

Accepting the new package and assigning the GPO to the relevant Organizational Unit (OU) will publish the application. The user(s) will then need to reload the group policy from the server which manages GPO. This can be done either through logging off and then on again, or by running "gpupdate" through a command line.

References

Installation software
Microsoft application programming interfaces
Windows administration
Windows components